826 National is a nonprofit organization dedicated to helping students, ages 6–18, improve their expository and creative writing skills. The organization's eight chapters include 826 Valencia in San Francisco, 826NYC in Brooklyn, 826LA in Los Angeles, 826CHI in Chicago, 826Michigan (serving Ann Arbor, Detroit, and Ypsilanti), 826 Boston in Boston, 826DC in Washington, DC, and 826 New Orleans.

History
The flagship chapter of 826, 826 Valencia, opened in 2002, at 826 Valencia St. in the Mission District of San Francisco. The original address inspired the name 826 National. It was co-founded by educator Nínive Clements Calegari and author Dave Eggers, who also founded the independent publishing house McSweeney's.

In April 2010, Dave Eggers founded ScholarMatch, a nonprofit organization that aims to make higher education possible for underserved youth. ScholarMatch coordinates students with various resources, donors, scholarships, and universities to aid in the financial undertaking of pursuing a college education.

Following the success and impact of 826 Valencia in its first two years, 826NYC opened its doors in 2004. In 2005, 826michigan, 826LA, and 826CHI were established, respectively. In 2007, 826 Boston joined the growing network, followed by 826DC, which opened in 2010.

In 2008, a national office was established to support the chapters and act as a central hub of the 826 network. 826 National is an independent nonprofit organization that provides strategic leadership, administration, and other resources to ensure the success of its writing and tutoring centers.

In addition, there are fifty 826-inspired organizations across the globe. 826 Digital support educators through 826 Digital, a new online pay-what- you-wish platform designed to help teach and ignite a love of writing. 

826 National is the hub of the 826 Network: facilitating collaboration and alignment among our chapters, and bringing the 826 Network model and approach to new communities.

Store themes 
Each 826 National store has an unusually-themed retail outlet. These include:

The Greater Seattle Bureau of Fearless Ideas, formerly called 826 Seattle, operates the Greenwood Space Travel Supply Company.

Volunteer network 
826 National programs are supported by over 6,000 active volunteers of various professions, ages, cultures, and socioeconomic backgrounds. Volunteers are trained by staff members for various areas of 826 programs: After-school tutoring, the Young Authors Book Project, field trips, in-school programs, and writing workshops. Volunteers can also help in administrative jobs, such as website maintenance and graphic design.

References

External links

 
Educational charities based in the United States
Non-profit organizations based in San Francisco
Organizations established in 2002
Culture in the San Francisco Bay Area
2002 establishments in California
Charities based in California